A multigraph is a mathematical graph where some pairs of vertices are connected by more than one edge.

Multigraph may also refer to:

 Multigraph (orthography), a sequence of letters that behaves as a unit and is not the sum of its parts
 Multigraph (programming), a sequence characters that appear in source code and, according to a programming language's specification, should be treated as if they were a single character
 American Multigraph, corporate-merger partner with producer of addressograph machines
 The Gammeter Multigraph, a machine that quickly produced multiple copies of a typewritten page